Everdon Stubbs is a  biological Site of Special Scientific Interest south-east of Everdon in Northamptonshire. It is owned and managed by the Woodland Trust.

This woodland site has areas of acidic free-draining soil, and other damper areas. It is described by Natural England as an important site for fungi, and there is a diverse range of breeding birds. There are locally uncommon plants such as wild daffodil, orpine and bitter vetch.

There is access from Stubbs Road, which goes through the site.

References

Sites of Special Scientific Interest in Northamptonshire